Qasba Mosque is an early 16th-century nine-domed mosque and archaeological site located in Barisal District of Bangladesh. It is located in the Qasba village under Gournadi Upazila. It is named after the village. The mosque, which has a total of nine domes, is very similar to the Nine Dome Mosque in Bagerhat.

History
The village of Qasba was an important centre in the Sultanate of Bengal and was home to several influential Muslim families. The mosque was constructed in the early 16th century, during the reign of Alauddin Husain Shah. The earlier Nine Dome Mosque built by Khan Jahan Ali in Khalifatabad is considered to be its inspiration due to the striking similarities. Despite the mosque's Sultanate origins, locals often credit the mosque to Sabi Khan, the Mughal faujdar of Bakla who built several mosques and roads in the region. Though still in use, the mosque is a protected monument by Department of Archaeology.

Architecture
The mosque has nin domes and four minars. The mosque measures 11.68×11.68 meters and the walls are 2.18 meters wide. There are three archways on the east side while there are one arch on each side of the north and south. The arches are decorated with terracotta paintings. It has four stone pillars inside.

Gallery

See also
 List of archaeological sites in Bangladesh

References

External links
 

Mosques in Bangladesh
Archaeological sites in Barisal district
Bengal Sultanate mosques